Mareva may refer to:

A Mareva injunction, a court order to freeze assets
Mareva Galanter, a French actress and beauty contestant
Alana Mareva, fictional character in The 4400
 Mareva, a factory name or vitola de galera for the classical Cuban cigar size Petit Corona